The Ferryman is a 2017 play by Jez Butterworth. Set during The Troubles, it tells the story of the family of a former IRA activist, living in their farmhouse in rural County Armagh, Northern Ireland in 1981.

Productions
The Ferryman had its world premiere at the Royal Court Theatre on 24 April 2017 running to 20 May, directed by Sam Mendes. It was the fastest-selling play in Royal Court Theatre history. The cast included Paddy Considine, Laura Donnelly (the disappearance of her real-life uncle, Eugene Simons, was the inspiration for Butterworth's plot), Genevieve O'Reilly, Bríd Brennan, Fra Fee, John Hodgkinson, Stuart Graham, Gerard Horan, Carla Langley, Des McAleer, Conor MacNeill, Rob Malone, Dearbhla Molloy, Eugene O'Hare and Niall Wright.

The production transferred to the Gielgud Theatre, opening on 29 June 2017, following previews from 20 June. After a first cast change on 9 October 2017 with William Houston (Quinn Carney), Sarah Greene (Caitlin Carney), Ivan Kaye (Tom Kettle) and others joining the company, a second cast change took place on 8 January 2018, featuring Rosalie Craig, Owen McDonnell (as Quinn Carney), Laurie Kynaston (as Oisin Carney) and Justin Edwards. The production closed on 19 May 2018.

The production transferred to the Bernard B. Jacobs Theatre on Broadway, beginning previews on 2 October 2018. The play, which went on to win four Tony Awards, closed on 7 July 2019.

Cast and characters

Awards and nominations

Original London production

Original Broadway production

References

External links
Official Website
Royal Court Listing
Internet Broadway Database

2017 plays
West End plays
Plays set in Ireland
Plays by Jez Butterworth
Fiction set in 1981
Laurence Olivier Award-winning plays
Tony Award-winning plays